Country Meadows is an unincorporated community in Ellington Township, Adams County, Illinois, United States. Country Meadows is north of Quincy.

References

Unincorporated communities in Adams County, Illinois
Unincorporated communities in Illinois